Fernandars "Scoop" Gillespie (February 26, 1962 – May 24, 2004) was an American football running back. He played for the Pittsburgh Steelers in 1984.

References

1962 births
2004 deaths
American football running backs
William Jewell Cardinals football players
Pittsburgh Steelers players